is a Japanese-Chinese original net animation series which aired in Chinese on streaming platforms from October 11 to December 27, 2021, and on Japanese television on Tokyo MX the following day. The series is licensed in North America by Funimation.

Characters

Episode list

References

External links
Anime official website 

2021 anime ONAs
2021 anime television series debuts
2021 Japanese novels
Anime with original screenplays
Funimation
Mecha anime and manga
Fiction about space warfare
Tokyo MX original programming